The Baillieu Ministry was the 67th ministry of the Government of Victoria. It was a Liberal–National Coalition Government led by the Premier of Victoria, Ted Baillieu, and Deputy Premier, Peter Ryan. It succeeded the Brumby Ministry on 2 December 2010, following the defeat of the Labor government at the 2010 state election, at which the Coalition won 45 Legislative Assembly seats to Labor's 43.

The Baillieu Ministry comprised 23 members, 6 of which were members of the Victorian Legislative Council and 17 were members of the Victorian Legislative Assembly. Five were members of the National Party and four were women.

On 6 March 2013, Baillieu resigned as Liberal leader and therefore as Premier. Denis Napthine was voted the new leader of the party and became Premier.

Ministry
Blue entries indicate members of the Liberal Party, and green entries indicate members of the National Party.

References

External links
 Members of Cabinet, Parliament of Victoria

Victoria (Australia) ministries
Liberal Party of Australia ministries in Victoria (Australia)
Ministries of Elizabeth II